Union Township is a township in Shelby County, Iowa. There are 572 people and 16 people per square mile in Union Township. The total area is 35.7 square miles.

References

Townships in Shelby County, Iowa
Townships in Iowa